Sri Jayadeva Institute of Cardiovascular Sciences and Research (SJICR) is a tertiary care autonomous healthcare institute run by the Government of Karnataka, in Bangalore, with additional centers in Mysore and Gulbarga. At the Bangalore campus, it presently has 1150 in-patient beds for cardiology, cardiothoracic surgery and pediatric cardiology, spread over two twin eight story buildings and is considered one of the largest dedicated heart hospitals in Asia. This new building which was opened in 2001 and was built at a cost of US$17 million.

Campuses

Main campus 
 Bannerghatta Road, Jayanagara 9th block, Bengaluru, Karnataka, 560041.

Other campuses 
 KRS Road, Kumabarakoppal, Mysuru, Karnataka, 570016.
 Gulbarga Institute of Medical Sciences Campus, Sedam Road, Kuvempunagara, Kalaburagi, Karnataka, 585105.

History
The original building for SJICR was located in Victori a Hospital complex. Victoria Hospital (Bangalore Medical College), is the main teaching hospital of the Bangalore Medical College. The hospital moved to its new buildings at Bannerghatta Road in 2001.

Building layout
SJICR campus in Bengaluru consist of twin eight story towers, with a separate facility for library and Cath labs. The emergency rooms are located in the basement with access from Bannerghatta road

Out patient Departments
The hospital caters to approximately 165,000 patients a year and both cardiology, cardio-thoracic and pediatric cardiology OPDs run Monday to Saturday from 9 am to 4 pm. The average patient volume per day is around 1000-1200 OPD visits.

In Patient facilities
There are more than 1150 in patient beds, spread over 8 floors of the two buildings most of them being in general wards and intensive care units and only a few in two private wards. It is considered to be the best cardiology set up in India and Asia and the super specialty training program is considered to be one of the best in India at par with AIIMS cardiology.

Expansion to other cities

The Kalaburagi campus was opened to public on 24 April 2016 and the Mysuru campus was opened to public on 24 February 2018.

Intensive Care Units
SJIC has 4 cardiac intensive care units. In total, the cardiology ICU bed numbers around 100 and are well equipped with individual ventilators, touch panel monitors, infusion pumps, powered beds and all necessary ancillary medical equipment.

Echo-cardiography lab
The echo lab is one of the busiest in the state with an average daily echo turnover of 160 trans-thoracic echo-cardiograms and 10 trans-esophageal echo-cardiograms. Each year around lakhs and lakhs echo is being done, the highest in India and Asia.

Interventional work
Average interventional cardiology workload ranges between 150 cases a day of which 700-800 cases per month are percutaneous coronary interventions, there are six Philips digital Cath labs, of which one is the only swing Cath lab in the region, enabling large case volumes and more efficient patient care.one Cath lab is dedicated Esp. for electrophysiology and one for pediatric cardiology. SJICR interventional cardiology includes both adult and pediatric cardiology, and every form of interventional procedure, from primary angioplasty, to septal ablation (Sigwart procedure) is performed on a regular basis. It has the distinction of performing the highest number of percutaneous mitral valvulotomy procedures in the world for stenosis of the mitral valve. Pediatric cardiology in SJIC performs all standard pediatric interventional procedures, including percutaneous closure for Atrial septal defect, ventricular septal defect and also the relatively rare procedure of percutaneous closure of peri membranous ventricular septal defects. The angioplasty work carried out in hospital is around 32000 per year the highest in India for a government set up. The institute boasts of the latest instruments and for most of the latest procedures in cardiology or Cath Lab, it is the pioneer in India.

Post Graduate Programmes
SJIC is the only government centre in the state of Karnataka to run post doctoral courses in cardiology and cardio-thoracic surgery. There are presently 21 seats for Doctorate in Medicine (DM) Cardiology and Master Chirurgiae (MCh) Cardio-thoracic surgery every year. These three-year courses are akin to the fellowship courses in cardiology and cardiothoracic surgery in other countries, and are entered to after a three year residency (MD/DNB) in either Medicine or Surgery, and are thus considered "Post Doctoral" courses or fellowships. These fellowships are much in demand partly in view of the fact that they are the only government sponsored courses in the state and also due to the high patient volume at SJIC which results in a higher degree of interventional experience after having completed the course, and, as such, are determined after an intensely contested all - India level examination conducted by the government of India. The patient load is one of the highest in India and so the choice of most of the post graduate doctorate trainees.

In 2008, the number of DM seats was increased to an unprecedented 21 per year and MCh seats to 12 per year, making it one of the largest Super-specialty training courses in India and Asia.

Director
The present director is Padma Shri Professor C. N. Manjunath, an academic and interventional cardiologist. Manjunath is reported to have been the innovator of a new method of balloon mitral valvuloplasty. His researches have been published in several articles and scientific papers published in peer reviewed national and international journals; PubMed, an online repository of medical data has listed 73 of his articles. He is known to have performed over 26,000 interventional procedures and is credited with the highest number of balloon mitral valvuloplasty using Accura balloon catheter in India. He is associated with Mallige Medical Centre, Bangalore as a consultant and is a member of the Indian Medical Association. He has also served as the president of the Indian College of Cardiology. The Government of Karnataka awarded him the Rajyotsava Prashasti in 1998 and he received the fourth highest Indian civilian honour of the Padma Shri in 2007. Rajiv Gandhi University of Health Sciences (RGUHS) honoured him in 2012 with the degree of Doctor of Science (Honoris causa).

References

External links
 Official Website

Hospital buildings completed in 2001
Colleges in Bangalore
Hospitals in Bangalore
Heart disease organizations
Medical colleges in Karnataka
Hospitals established in 1972
1972 establishments in Mysore State